The following is a timeline of the history of the city of St. Louis, Missouri, United States.

Prior to 19th-century

 1764 – St. Louis founded by Pierre Laclède in Louisiana, New Spain.
 1767 - It was "a log-cabin village of perhaps 500 inhabitants".
 1770 - Spanish in power.
 1780 – "Indian attack."
 1785 - Floods.
 1799 – Population: 925.

19th century

1800s–1850s

 1800 – St. Louis becomes part of French Louisiana.
 1804
 St. Louis becomes part of U.S. territory per Louisiana Purchase.
 Post Office established.
 1805 – St. Louis becomes capital of the U.S. Louisiana Territory.
 1808 – Missouri Gazette newspaper begins publication.
 1809
 Town incorporated.
 Missouri Fur Company established.
 1811 – December 16: New Madrid earthquake.
 1812 – St. Louis County established.
 1815 – Theatre opens.
 1816 – Bank of St. Louis incorporated.
 1818
 Saint Louis Academy founded.
 Baptist Church built.
 1819 – Erin Benevolent Society founded.
 1820
 June: Missouri constitutional convention held.
 September: Missouri General Assembly convenes.
 1821
 St. Louis becomes part of the new U.S. state of Missouri.
 City Directory begins publication.
 1822
 City of St. Louis incorporated.
 Area of city: 385 acres.
 1823 – William Carr Lane becomes mayor.
 1825 – Lafayette visits town.
 1826 – Catholic Diocese of St. Louis established.
 1828 – County Courthouse built.
 1830 – Population: 4,977.
 1832 - Cholera.
 1834
 Daily Evening Herald newspaper begins publication.
 Cathedral of St. Louis consecrated.
 1835 – Anzeiger des Westens German-language newspaper begins publication.
 1836 – Chamber of Commerce established.
 1837 – Daniel Webster visits city.
 1840
 City boundaries expanded.
 Population: 16,469.
 1841
 United Hebrew Congregation founded.
 Area of city: 4.5 square miles.
 1844
 Anti-immigration unrest.
 Floods.
 1846
 Dred Scott files lawsuit.
 Mercantile Library Association established.
 1847 – Boatmen's Savings Institution chartered.
 1849
 Concordia Seminary relocates to St. Louis.
 Cholera epidemic.
 Fire.
 Bellefontaine Cemetery established.
 1850
 Third Baptist Church established.
 Population: 77,860.
 1851 – Bates' Theatre opens.
 1852
 Iron Mountain railroad built.
 Bavarian Brewery in business.
 1853 – Washington University founded.
 1854 – Czech Slavonic Benevolent Society founded.
 1856
 Academy of Science founded.
 St. Louis Agricultural and Mechanical Fair begins.
 Grand Opera House opens.
 1857
 For the next quarter century, the city was "the centre of an idealistic philosophical movement".
 St. Louis Fire Department established.
 Lindell Hotel in business.
 Dred Scott decision in March, 1857.
 Westliche Post (German language newspaper) established. (closed 1938)
 1859
 Horse-drawn streetcars begin operating .
 Mary Institute founded.
 Synagogue consecrated on Sixth Street.
 Missouri Botanical Garden founded.

1860s–1890s

 1860 – Population: 160,773.
 1861 – Western Sanitary Commission and Ladies Union Aid Society established.
 1862 – Hoelke and Benecke photo studio in business.
 1865
 Sokol sport club, and Germania Association established.
 St. Louis Public Library established.
 Southern Hotel and Meyer & Brother drug store in business.
 1866
 Cholera epidemic.
 Missouri Historical Society headquartered in city.
 Olympic Theatre opens.
 1867 – City Board of Health and Compton Hill Reservoir Park established.
 1869 – Congregation Shaare Emeth founded.
 1870
 Carondelet becomes part of St. Louis.
 Area of city: 17.98 square miles.
 Population: 310,864.
 1871
 1871 St. Louis tornado.
 Puck German-language magazine begins publication.
 1872
 Maryville College of the Sacred Heart and University Club founded.
 Catholic Amerika begins publication.
 Smallpox outbreak.
 1873 – Laclede Gas Light Company in business.
 1874 – Eads Bridge opened.
 1875
 Merchants Exchange opens.
 Brownell and Wight Car Company in business.
 1876
 June: City hosts 1876 Democratic National Convention.
 Forest Park opens.
 Busch's Budweiser beer introduced.
 Area of city: 61.37 square miles.
 1877
 City secedes from St. Louis County.
 July: 1877 St. Louis general strike.
 1878 – St. Louis Post-Dispatch newspaper begins publication.
 1879
 Anheuser-Busch Brewing Association and J.C. Strauss photo studio in business.
 St. Louis Children's Hospital opened.
 St. Louis School of Fine Arts opened.
 Pope's Theatre opens.
 1880
 St. Stanislaus Kostka Church built.
 Population: 350,518.
 1882 – Mallinckrodt Chemical Works incorporated.
 1883 – St. Louis Exposition and Music Hall opens.
 1884 – St. Louis Maroons baseball team active.
 1886
 May 1: Labour strike.
 St. Louis Watchmaking School and Congregation Temple Israel founded.
 1888 – City hosts 1888 Democratic National Convention.
 1889
 Missouri Botanical Garden established.
 Tower Grove Park established.
 Merchants Bridge opened.
 1890
 Portland and Westmoreland Places begin to develop.
 Population: 451,770.
 1891
 Rubicam Business School established.
 Wainwright Building constructed.
 Washington University School of Medicine opened.
 American Car Company in business.
 Air conditioning installed in the Ice Palace beerhall.
 1892
 St. Louis Browns baseball team active.
 St. Louis Country Club established.
 Stix Baer & Fuller (shop) in business.
 National People's Party founded in St. Louis.
 1894 – Union Station opens.
 1896
 May: 1896 St. Louis–East St. Louis tornado.
 June: Flood.
 City hosts 1896 Republican National Convention.
 Busch's Michelob beer introduced.
 1898 – Compton Hill Water Tower erected.

20th-century

1900s–1970s

 1900
 St. Louis Streetcar Strike of 1900.
 Monsanto Chemical Works in business.
 Population: 575,238.
 1902 – Sportsman's Park opens.
 1903 – Missouri Athletic Club founded.
 1904
 Buckingham Hotel built.
 Inside Inn an hotel built of wood.
 April: St. Louis World's Fair opens;
 Saint Louis Art Museum built.
 City hosts 1904 Summer Olympics and 1904 Democratic National Convention.
 Louisiana Purchase Exposition held.
 1905
 May Department Store relocates to St. Louis.
 Shaare Zedek Synagogue founded.
 1906
 Racquet Club of St. Louis founded.
 Statue of Louis IX of France unveiled in Forest Park.
 1908
 Aero Club of St. Louis incorporated.
 Aeronautic Supply Company in business.
 St. Louis Coliseum re-built.
 Fairground Park established.
 1909 – October: City centennial.
 1910 – Population: 687,029.
 1911
 Urban League branch established.
 Famous-Barr (shop) in business.
 Benoist Flying School established.
 1912
 Ethical Society building constructed.
 St. Louis Argus newspaper begins publication.
 Missouri Peace Society founded.
 1913 – Henry Kiel becomes mayor.
 1914
 Federal Reserve Bank of St. Louis begins operating.
 National Association for the Advancement of Colored People branch established.
 Railway Exchange Building constructed.
 "Pageant and Masque of Saint Louis" held.
 St. Louis Zoo incorporated.
 Barnes Hospital opened.
 New charter adopted reducong the elective officers to terms of four years.
 Cathedral Basilica of Saint Louis completed.
 1915 – Junior League of St. Louis organized.
 1917 
MacArthur Bridge opens.
St. Louis Municipal Opera Theatre (The Muny) opens
 1918
 Poro beauty school opens.
 1919
 League of Women Voters of St. Louis organized.
 City Hospital No. 2 begins operating.
 Pine Street YMCA opens.
 1920
 Chase Hotel built.
 Population: 772,897.
 1921
 WEW radio begins broadcasting.
 American Association of University Women chapter active.
 1925 – St. Louis Theater opens.
 1926
 Southwestern Bell Building constructed.
 New Masonic Temple built.
 1927
 Racquet Club of St. Louis funds Lindbergh's Spirit of St. Louis airplane.
 Tornado.
 B.F. Mahoney Aircraft Corporation in business.
 1928 – St. Louis American newspaper begins publication.
 1929
 Fox Theatre opens.
 St. Louis Arena opened.
 1930 – Lambert-St. Louis Municipal Airport dedicated.
 1931 – Rombauer's Joy of Cooking published.
 1933
 Firmin Desloge Hospital opens.
 Anheuser-Busch's Budweiser Clydesdales established.
 1935 – Neighborhood Gardens (housing) opens.
 1937 – Floral Conservatory built in Forest Park.
 1939
 1939 St. Louis smog.
 Oldani's restaurant in business.
 1940 – Population: 816,048.
 1942 – George Hudson Orchestra debuts.
 1943 – Campbell House Museum opens.
 1947 – Congress of Racial Equality chapter organized.
 1948 – U.S. Supreme Court decides Shelley v. Kraemer lawsuit.
 1949 – Fairground Park riot.
 1950 – Population: 856,796.
 1951 – Veterans' Memorial Bridge built.
 1954
 KETC television begins broadcasting.
 Pruitt–Igoe housing built.
 1955
 Peabody Coal Company relocates to St. Louis.
 Hellmuth, Obata and Kassabaum architects in business.
 1958 – Landmarks Association of St. Louis established.
 1959 – St. Louis sit-in during the Civil Rights Movement.
 1960
 Population: 750,026.
 Sister city relationship established with Stuttgart, Germany.
 The National Football League's Chicago Cardinals relocate to St. Louis. They will remain through 1987. 
 1962 – St. Louis Community College established.
 1963
 University of Missouri–St. Louis established.
 MetroBus begins operating.
 Planetarium opens.
 1964
 LaClede Town (housing) opens.
 Imo's Pizza in business in Shaw.
 Cardinals win the World Series, defeating New York Yankees in seven games
 1965
 Gateway Arch erected.
 Regional East-West Gateway Council of Governments established.
 1966 – Busch Stadium opens.
 1967
 Poplar Street Bridge completed.
 St. Louis Blues - National Hockey League - NHL Expansion ice hockey team formed.
 K-SHE 95 (94.7) FM radio station begins broadcasting its current Rock n' Roll format.
 Cardinals win the World Series, defeating Boston Red Sox in seven games
 1969 – Laclede Gas Building constructed.
 1970
 Student antiwar demonstration.
 Population: 622,236.
 1972 - Demolition of Pruitt-Igoe begins and will last four years. 
 1974
 St. Louis Port Authority created.
 Sister city relationship established with Suwa, Japan.
 1976 – Sister city relationship established with Lyon, France.
 1977
 St. Louis Convention Center opens.
 James F. Conway becomes mayor.
 Sister city relationship established with Galway, Ireland.
 1979 – Sister city relationship established with Nanjing, China.

1980s–1990s

 1980 - Contemporary Art Museum St. Louis established.
 1981 – Gwen B. Giles is the first woman and first African-American appointed to lead the St. Louis City Assessor's Office.
 1982 - Cardinals win World Series, defeating Milwaukee Brewers in seven games
 1986
 Express Scripts and Galleria Cinema in business.
 Southwestern Bell Telephone Building constructed.
 1987
 Sister city relationship established with Bologna, Italy.
 Lindbergh Plaza cinema in business.
 Football Cardinals play final season in St. Louis before relocating to Arizona
 1989 – One Metropolitan Square (hi-rise) built.
 1990
 Population: 396,685.
 Sister city relationship established with Georgetown, Guyana.
 1991 - Hindu Temple of St. Louis founded.
 1992 – Sister city relationships established with Szczecin, Poland and Samara, Russia.
 1993 – MetroLink begins operating.
 1994
 Kiel Center arena opens.
 Sister city relationship established with Saint-Louis, Senegal.
 1995
 St. Louis Rams football team relocates from Los Angeles..
 Trans World Dome (stadium) opens.
 1997
 City website online (approximate date).
 Ameren Corporation in business.
 Clarence Harmon becomes mayor.
 St. Louis Missouri Temple inaugurated.

21st-century
 2000 – Population: 348,189.
 2001
 Pulitzer Arts Foundation museum opens.
 Francis G. Slay becomes mayor.
 William Lacy Clay, Jr. becomes U.S. representative for Missouri's 1st congressional district.
 Veterans for Peace headquartered in St. Louis.
 2002 – St. Louis Building Arts Foundation active (approximate date).
 2003 – St. Louis Area Regional Response System headquartered in city.
 2004 – Sister city relationship established with Bogor, Indonesia.
 2006  
 New Busch Stadium built.
 Cardinals win World Series, defeating Detroit Tigers in five games
 2007 – Center for Citizen Leadership headquartered in St. Louis.
 2008 – Sister city relationship established with Brčko, Bosnia and Herzegovina.
 2009 – Citygarden opens.
 2010 – Population: 319,294; metro 2,812,896.
 2011 
 October: Occupy St. Louis begins.
 Cardinals win World Series, defeating Texas Rangers in seven games
 2014
 August 9: Shooting in nearby Ferguson, unrest ensues.
 Musial Bridge and Center for Jazz open.
 2016
 Rams leave St. Louis and become the L.A. Rams once again.
 2019 - Blues win Stanley Cup for the first time, defeating Boston Bruins in seven games
 2023 - St. Louis City Stadium scheduled to open

See also
 History of St. Louis
 List of mayors of St. Louis
 National Register of Historic Places listings in St. Louis (city, A–L), Missouri
 National Register of Historic Places listings in St. Louis (city, M–Z), Missouri
 Timeline of Kansas City, Missouri

References

Bibliography

 
 
 
 
 
 
 
 
 
 
 
 
 
 
 
 
 Saint Louis: a Chronological and Documentary History, 1762–1970, by Robert Vexler. Dobbs Ferry: Oceana Publications, 1974.

External links
 
 
 
 Digital Public Library of America. Items related to St. Louis, various dates

 
saint louis
St. Louis-related lists
Years in Missouri